Moisés García Fernández (born 1 June 1969), known as Arteaga, is a Spanish former footballer who played as a left midfielder, currently manager of Gibraltarian club Europa.

Playing career
Born in Cádiz, Arteaga made his professional debut with hometown club Cádiz CF, becoming firmly established as a first-team member in 1991–92. In the following season, the Andalusians were relegated from La Liga and he also moved down a division to play for RCD Espanyol.

In his first two seasons with the Catalans, Arteaga was instrumental in helping them return to the top flight and immediately finish sixth the following campaign, totalling ten goals in 66 games. He continued appearing regularly for the side until 2000–01, winning the Copa del Rey in 2000.

After a year on loan at Rayo Vallecano, Arteaga returned to Espanyol, retiring from professional football at the end of the 2002–03 season with top division totals of 330 matches and 37 goals. Until 2007, he played for amateurs Chiclana CF in his native region.

Coaching career
Arteaga started working as a manager with CD Badajoz, first as assistant. In late December 2011, he replaced Víctor Torres Mestre at the helm of the Segunda División B club.

On 29 March 2022, Artega was appointed at Europa in the Gibraltar National League.

Personal life
Arteaga was born in the same place and on the same day as fellow Cádiz youth graduate José María Quevedo.

Honours
Espanyol
Copa del Rey: 1999–2000
Segunda División: 1993–94

References

External links

Stats and bio at Cadistas1910 
Espanyol archives 

1969 births
Living people
People of Canarian descent
Spanish footballers
Footballers from Cádiz
Association football midfielders
La Liga players
Segunda División players
Tercera División players
Cádiz CF B players
Cádiz CF players
RCD Espanyol footballers
Rayo Vallecano players
Chiclana CF players
Spanish football managers
Segunda División B managers
CD Badajoz managers

Spanish expatriate football managers
Expatriate football managers in Gibraltar
Spanish expatriate sportspeople in Gibraltar